JQ may refer to:

 Air Jamaica Express (former IATA airline designator)
 Jetstar (IATA airline designator)
 Jewish Question, as used by the alt-right and the neo-Nazis
 Johnston Atoll (FIPS PUB 10-4 territory code)
 Joshua Quagmire, a cartoonist
 Jon Qwelane, a South African journalist, broadcaster and diplomat
 jq, a high-level programming language that serves as a query language for JSON